China Sunergy is a Chinese solar cell products manufacturer based in Nanjing, Jiangsu. The company specializes in creating solar cells from silicon wafers. China Sunergy has a major customer base in China, but also sells their products internationally. On May 17, 2007, the company began producing both monocrystalline and multicrystalline silicon solar cells. In 2012 the annual production of the cells were 1 GW and PV modules 1.2 GW. After listing as a NASDAQ Company in 2007, in 2013 May 23 China Sunergy opened its first international manufacturing base in Turkey. Turkey factory has the biggest solar cell and module capacity among both in Turkey and Europe. CSUN currently is the only Chinese solar cells and module manufacturer with a manufacturing base in Europe. Located in Tuzla Free Trade Zone, Istanbul, CSUN (Turkey) is in progress of building its second factory in Turkey within 2015. CSUN has  been recognized as a Tier 1 module supplier by the Bloomberg New Energy Finance (BENF) PV Module Maker Tiering System on 23 March 2014.

Their distribution network for solar panels covers over 79 distributors and wholesalers, across over 26 different countries.

References

External links
China Sunergy website
China Sunergy (Greece)  website
Reuters

Solar energy in China
Photovoltaics manufacturers
Renewable energy technology companies
Technology companies of China
Manufacturing companies based in Nanjing
Manufacturing companies established in 2006
Chinese companies established in 2006
Companies formerly listed on the Nasdaq
Chinese brands
2007 initial public offerings